Sir Gordon Ellis Bisson  (23 November 1918 – 14 November 2010) was a New Zealand Court of Appeal judge and a member of the Privy Council of the United Kingdom.

Early life and education
Bisson was born to Clarence Henry Bisson and Ada Bisson (née Ellis) in 1918 in Napier. Educated at Napier Boys' High School, he graduated from Victoria University College with a Bachelor of Laws in 1941. Bisson served with the RNZNVR during World War II from 1940 to 1945 aboard  in the Pacific,  at Normandy and the Second Front, and was Mentioned in Despatches. He then served aboard  at sea on the Staff of Admiral Walker Commanding the Third Battle Squadron in the Far East and was promoted to Lieutenant Commander. He was later married in 1948 to Myra Patricia Kemp. The couple went on to have three daughters.

Legal career
Bisson began his legal career with Bisson Moss, the firm established in 1920 by his father. In 1961 he was appointed Crown Solicitor, Napier, and in 1976 was appointed Judge-Courts Martial Appeal Court. Then In 1978 he was appointed a Judge of the Supreme (then High) Court.

In 1986, he was elevated to the Court of Appeal and sat there until he retired at age 72 in 1990. In 1987, he was appointed a Privy Counsellor and he sat on the Board in 1989.

As a retired New Zealand Court of Appeal judge, Bisson served on the Samoan Court of Appeal from 1994 until 2005 for which he was awarded the Companion of the Order of Samoa. He was also a member of the Court of Appeal of Kiribati from 1999 until 2001.

Honours and awards
 1939 – Sir Michael Myers C.J. Prize in Law
 1986 – Appointed to the Privy Council
 1990 – Awarded New Zealand 1990 Commemoration Medal
 1991 – Appointed a Knight Bachelor in the 1991 New Year Honours
 2006 – Companion of the Order of Samoa

Publications
Articles
 Papers on Matrimonial Property Law Commonwealth and Empire Law Conference 1960 and N.Z. Law Society Conference 1963
 co-author, Criminal Law and Practice in NZ (1st Edn 1964)
 co-author, Report for International Commission of Jurists on Martial Law in the Philippines (1977).

Community service
President:  Hawke's Bay District Law Society, Hawke's Bay Officers' Club, Hawke's Bay Medico Legal Society, Hawke's Bay Lawn Tennis Club
Vice President:  N.Z. Law Society, N.Z. Section International Commission of Jurists
Trustee:  N.Z. Law Foundation 1982–88
Chairman: Banking Ombudsman Commission, Meat Export Quota Tribunal

References

1918 births
2010 deaths
People from Napier, New Zealand
High Court of New Zealand judges
Court of Appeal of New Zealand judges
New Zealand judges on the courts of Kiribati
New Zealand judges on the courts of Samoa
New Zealand Knights Bachelor
New Zealand members of the Privy Council of the United Kingdom